Aequorivita is a Gram-negative and strictly aerobic bacterial genus from the family of Flavobacteriaceae.

References

Further reading 
  
 

Flavobacteria
Bacteria genera